Rebecca Rea Sugar (born July 9, 1987) is an American animator and screenwriter. She is best known for being the creator of the Cartoon Network series Steven Universe, making her the first non-binary person to independently create a series for the network. Until 2013, Sugar was a writer and storyboard artist on the animated television series Adventure Time. Her work on the two series has earned her seven Primetime Emmy Award nominations. Sugar is bisexual, non-binary, and genderqueer, using both she/her and they/them pronouns. Sugar's queerness has served as the inspiration for her to stress the importance of LGBT representation in the arts, especially in children's entertainment.

Early life 
Sugar was raised in the Sligo Park Hills area of Silver Spring, Maryland. She simultaneously attended Montgomery Blair High School and the Visual Arts Center at Albert Einstein High School (where she was an arts semifinalist in the Presidential Scholar competition, and won Montgomery County's prestigious Ida F. Haimovicz Visual Arts Award), both of which are located in Maryland. While at Blair, she drew several comics (called "The Strip" for the school's newspaper, Silver Chips) which won first place for comics in the Newspaper Individual Writing and Editing Contest. "The Strip" ran a comic challenging MCPS's new grading policy from 2005. She went on to attend the School of Visual Arts in New York.

According to Sugar's father Rob, Rebecca Sugar and her younger brother Steven were raised with what he called "Jewish sensibilities", and both siblings observe the lighting of Hanukkah candles with their parents via Skype.

Career

Early work 
During her time at the School of Visual Arts, Sugar directed short animated films, including Johnny Noodleneck (2008). In 2009, she wrote and animated Singles, in which frequent collaborator Ian Jones-Quartey acted as an assistant animator, assistant inker and voice actor on the project, while Sugar's brother Steven Sugar acted as an assistant colorist. Sugar completed this film as her thesis.

Sugar also played an important role in the creation of nockFORCE, a cartoon series created by Ian Jones-Quartey and Jim Gisriel and launched in 2007 on YouTube. In particular, she contributed to the cartoon's backgrounds and characters.

In 2010, Sugar published her first graphic novel, Pug Davis, featuring an astronaut dog and his gay sidekick Blouse.

She is also known for her comic "Don't Cry for Me, I'm Already Dead", a story about two brothers whose shared love of The Simpsons takes a tragic turn.

Television 
Sugar first joined the crew of Adventure Time as a storyboard revisionist during the show's first season. Due to the quality of her work, within a month of being hired she was promoted to a storyboard artist, making her debut during the production of the second season. Her first episode was "It Came from the Nightosphere". While working on the show, she was encouraged by the creative team to put her "own life experiences into the character of Marceline". As she put it in an interview with Paper Magazine, she connected with indie and underground comic artists who worked on the show, like Pendleton Ward, Patrick McHale and Adam Muto, who told her to do what she would do when drawing comics and to not hold anything back. She stated that some of the changes in animation for years to come were inspired by what the show was able to do by being "very artist-driven", by independent comic artists like herself.

Production for Steven Universe began while Sugar was still working on Adventure Time. She continued working on Adventure Time until the show's fifth season, whereupon she left in order to focus on Steven Universe. Her last episode for Adventure Time was "Simon & Marcy"; following that episode, working on both series simultaneously "became impossible to do". She had also previously encountered difficulty in the production of the Adventure Time episode "Bad Little Boy". Sugar returned temporarily to write the song "Everything Stays" for the seventh season miniseries Stakes, and the song "Time Adventure" for the series finale, Come Along With Me.

She was an executive producer for Steven Universe for its entire run, and a storyboard artist for several of its episodes; the series premiered on November 4, 2013 and concluded on January 21, 2019. She directed the full-length television movie taking place after the fifth season of Steven Universe, called Steven Universe: The Movie, which premiered on September 2, 2019 on Cartoon Network. The movie was followed by an epilogue limited series titled Steven Universe Future, also with Sugar as executive producer, which premiered on December 7, 2019 and concluded on March 27, 2020.

Themes 
Sugar has discussed the importance of creating LGBT representation and content, especially in children's entertainment. On Cameron Esposito's podcast QUEERY, Sugar stated "I want to champion LGBTQIA, all of it, content... in G-Rated, family entertainment. I want to do that forever". She also explained how Steven Universe has helped her come to terms with her own identity as bisexual and non-binary. She believes that early and positive exposure to the LGBT community can help queer identifying children avoid experiencing shame in their own identities.

Other work 
Sugar designed the album cover of True Romance for Estelle, the voice of Garnet on Steven Universe.

In December 2016, comic book publisher Youth in Decline featured Sugar's sketches and story notes for her unpublished comic Margo in Bed as issue #14 of the art/comics anthology series Frontier.

In 2018, Sugar was featured on Gallant's 2018 R&B/Soul track TOOGOODTOBETRUE, along with Sufjan Stevens.

In April 2020, Sugar narrated a video titled Let My People Go, a video created by the organization Never Again Action. The video talks about U.S. Immigration and Customs Enforcement detainees and the poor living conditions they are experiencing in light of the COVID-19 pandemic.

Between October 2020 and April 2021, the anti-racism PSAs "Don't Deny It, Defy It", "Tell the Whole Story", "See Color", and "Be An Ally", that she worked on with Ian Jones-Quartey, featuring characters from Steven Universe, were released on the Cartoon Network YouTube channel.

In the "Froggy Little Christmas" episode of Amphibia, a 22-minute Christmas special which aired on November 27, 2021, Sugar voiced a street performer who sang a musical number which Sugar had written. Sugar was not credited for her contribution to the episode. Matt Braly, the creator of Amphibia, praised her song as "really amazing" and saying that it had been stuck in his head and that of the crew for months.

Personal life 
In February 2016, Ian Jones-Quartey confirmed via Twitter that he and Sugar were in a romantic relationship; at the time of the tweet, the two had been together for eight years. He added that they met when Sugar was at the School of Visual Arts in New York. They were married on December 4, 2019.

In July 2016, Sugar said at a San Diego Comic-Con panel that the LGBT themes in Steven Universe are in large part based on her own experience as a bisexual woman. In a July 2018 interview on NPR, Sugar said that she created the series' Gems as non-binary women in order to express herself, as a non-binary woman, through them. In August 2020, she said she "didn't identify as a woman" but had felt pressure to conceal that fact because of her reputation as the first woman to create a Cartoon Network series. In October 2020, in the final art book for Steven Universe, Sugar said that she loved being able to place her experiences in a different context "through a nonbinary lens" when writing characters for the show. As of 2022, Sugar goes by both "she/her" and "they/them" pronouns.

Accolades

Adventure Time 
Rebecca Sugar's work on Adventure Time gained Primetime Emmy Award for Short-format Animation nominations for the episode "It Came from the Nightosphere" in 2011 and for the episode "Simon & Marcy" in 2013. The show also earned multiple Annie Award nominations. These included, Best Storyboarding in a Television Production in 2012 and Story-boarding in an Animated Television Production in 2013.

Steven Universe 

For Steven Universe, Sugar has been nominated for several media industry awards, including six Primetime Emmy Awards. She and the series have received, among others, the 2018 Peabody Award for Children's & Youth Programming and the 2019 GLAAD Media Award for Outstanding Kids & Family Program; in 2015 the series was named to the James Tiptree Jr. Award Honor List.

Honors 
In 2012, Forbes magazine included her on its "30 Under 30 in Entertainment" list, noting that she was responsible for writing "many of the best episodes" of Adventure Time.

Variety included Sugar in "Hollywood's New Leaders 2016: The Creatives", a list celebrating upcoming filmmakers, show-runners and creators in both traditional and digital media.

Filmography

Notes

References

External links 

 
 

American animated film producers
1987 births
Animators from Maryland
21st-century American composers
21st-century American Jews
21st-century American screenwriters
American storyboard artists
American television producers
American television writers
Bisexual artists
Bisexual singers
Bisexual songwriters
Bisexual composers
Bisexual screenwriters
Bisexual Jews
Cartoon Network Studios people
Jewish American composers
Jewish American songwriters
Jewish American writers
Jewish American artists
LGBT animators
LGBT people from Maryland
LGBT television producers
American LGBT screenwriters
American LGBT songwriters
American LGBT singers
Living people
Non-binary directors
Non-binary artists
Non-binary singers
Non-binary songwriters
Non-binary composers
Non-binary screenwriters
School of Visual Arts alumni
Showrunners
Songwriters from Maryland
People from Silver Spring, Maryland
Bisexual non-binary people
American non-binary writers
American bisexual writers